Yacouba Mandingo Camara (born 2 June 1994) is a French rugby union player who currently plays for Montpellier in the French Top 14. His regular playing position is as a Flanker.

Club career
Camara made his debut for Toulouse in the 2013-14 season, aged 19. He transferred to Montpellier Hérault Rugby in 2017.

International career
Camara was born in France and is of Malian descent. He has starred for the French national u-20 side and was included in Guy Noves' 30-man 6 Nations squad for the 2016 campaign.

References

External links
France profile at FFR

French rugby union players
French sportspeople of Malian descent
Stade Toulousain players
Sportspeople from Aubervilliers
Living people
1994 births
France international rugby union players
Rugby union flankers